The architecture of the Song dynasty (960–1279) was noted for its towering Buddhist pagodas, enormous stone and wooden bridges, lavish tombs, and extravagant palaces. Although literary works on architecture existed beforehand, architectural writing blossomed during the Song dynasty, maturing into a more professional form that described dimensions and working materials in a concise, organized manner. In addition to the examples still standing, depictions in Song artwork, architectural drawings, and illustrations in published books all aid modern historians in understanding the architecture of the period.

The professions of architect, master craftsman, carpenter, and structural engineer did not have the high status of the Confucian scholar-officials during the dynastic era. Architectural knowledge had been passed down orally for thousands of years, usually from craftsman fathers to their sons. There were also government agencies and schools for construction, building, and engineering. The Song dynasty's building manuals aided not only the various private workshops, but also the craftsmen employed by the central government.

City and palace

The layout of ancient Chinese capitals, such as Bianjing, capital of the Northern Song, followed the guidelines in Kao Gong Ji, which specified a square city wall with several gates on each side and passageways for the emperor. The south wall had three gates, with Nanxun Gate in the center, Chenzhou Gate to the east, and Dailou Gate to the west. The other walls had four gates each: in the east wall were Dongshui Gate (at the southern end), Xinsong Gate, Xinchao Gate, and North-East Water Gate; in the west wall Xinzheng Gate, West Water Gate, Wansheng Gate, and Guzi Gate; and in the north wall Chenqiao Gate (at the eastern end), Fengqiu Gate, New Wild Jujube Gate and Weizhou Gate. The gates in the center of each of the four sides were reserved for the emperor; these gates had straight passages and only two sets of doors, while the other city gates had zigzag passages and were guarded by three sets of doors.

The Song artist Zhang Zeduan's painting Along the River During the Qingming Festival depicts the Dongshui Gate in detail: the building on top had a five-ridged roof with a shallow slope in the Song dynasty style, supported prominently by two sets of brackets (dougong). The lower bracket assembly rested on the city gate to form a wooden foundation, while the upper assembly supported the roof, similar to the dougong in an extant Song building, the Goddess Temple in Taiyuan. This method of using bracket assemblies to support superstructure was specified in the 12th-century building manual Yingzao Fashi as pingzuo (literally "flat base").

The city wall itself was built with rammed earth, a technique also detailed in Yingzao Fashi, vol. III, "Standards for Moat, Stronghold and Masonry Work":
Foundation: For every square chi, apply two dan of earth; on top of it lay a mixture of broken brick, tile and crushed stones, also two dan. For every five-cun layer of earth, two men, standing face to face, should tamp six times with pestles, each man pounding three times on a dent; then tamp four times on each dent, two men again standing face to face, each pounding twice on the same dent; then tamp two more times, each man pounding once. Following this, tamp the surface with pestles or stamp with feet randomly to even out the surface. Every five-cun layer of earth should be compressed to three cun; every three-cun layer of brick and stone to one and a half cun.

Rammed-earth walls during this time were tapered: the thickness of the wall is greatest at the base and decreases steadily with increasing height, as detailed in Li Jie's book.

During the Song dynasty, the city of Bianjing had three enclosures: the outer city wall, the inner city wall, and the palace at the center. The inner city was rectangular, with three doors on each side. The palace enclosure was also rectangular, with a watch tower on each of the four corners. It had four main gates: Xihua Gate to the west, Donghua Gate to the east, Gongchen Gate to the north, and Xuande Gate, also known as Duan Gate or Xuandelou, at the south. Xuande Gate had five-paneled doors, painted red and decorated with gold tacks; its walls were lavishly decorated with dragon, phoenix and floating-cloud patterns to match the carved beams, painted rafters and glazed-tile roof. There were also two glazed dragons, each biting an end of the rooftop ridge, its tail pointing to the sky. The symbolic function of these chi wei was explained in Yingzao Fashi:
There is a dragon in the East Sea, whose tail (wei) is similar to that of a sparrow-hawk (chi); it stirs up waves and causes rainfall, so people put its likeness on the rooftop to prevent fire. However, they misnamed it "sparrow-hawk tail" (chi wei).

Running southward from Xuande Gate was the Imperial Boulevard, about two hundred paces wide, with the Imperial Corridors on either side. Merchants opened shops in the Corridors until 1112, when they were banned. Two rows of black fencing were placed at the center of the boulevard as a barrier to pedestrians and carriages. Along the inner sides of the fences ran the brick-lined Imperial Water Furrows, filled with lotus. This design of a boulevard with a stone bridge crossing a river was later imitated in the Forbidden City. During spring and summer, mingled peach, plum, pear and apricot trees adorned the banks of the Bian with a variety of flowers.

Buddhist pagodas

Following the reign of the Han dynasty, (202 BC–220 AD), the idea of the Buddhist stupa entered Chinese culture as a means to house and protect scriptural sutras. During the Southern and Northern Dynasties period, the distinctive Chinese pagoda was developed, its predecessors being the tall watch towers and towering residential apartments of the Han dynasty (as inferred from models in Han-era tombs). During the Sui (581–618) and Tang (618–907) periods, Chinese pagodas were developed from purely wooden structures to use articulated stone and brick, which could more easily survive fires caused by lightning or arson and were less susceptible to decay. The earliest brick pagoda that remains extant is the Songyue Pagoda, built in 523, and a typical example of a Tang-era stone pagoda is the Giant Wild Goose Pagoda, constructed in 652. Although Buddhist influences on China waned after the late Tang period, numerous Buddhist pagoda towers were built during the Song dynasty. Tall Chinese pagodas were often built in the countryside rather than within a city's walls, largely to avoid competition with the cosmic-imperial authority embodied in the cities' drum- and gate-towers. The Giant Wild Goose Pagoda, built in a city ward of what was southeastern Chang'an, is among the exceptions.

The Iron Pagoda of Youguo Temple in Kaifeng earned its name from the iron-grey color of the glazed bricks forming the tower. Originally built of wood by the architect Yu Hao, it was struck by lightning and burned down in 1044, during the Northern Song period. In 1049 the pagoda was rebuilt as it appears today, under the order of Emperor Renzong of Song. Its glazed tile bricks feature carved artwork of dancing figures, solemn ministers, and Buddhist themes (see gallery below).

The period also featured true cast-iron pagodas, such as the Iron Pagoda of Yuquan Temple (Jade Springs Temple), Dangyang, Hubei Province. Imitating contemporary wooden, stone, and brick pagodas, the pagoda features sloping eaves and an octagonal base. Another iron pagoda was constructed in 1105, Jining, Shandong, and was cast layer by layer in octagonal sections, standing 78 feet high. Several such cast iron pagodas exist in China today.

The Liuhe Pagoda, or Six Harmonies Pagoda, is another example of Song-era pagoda architecture. It is located in the Southern Song capital of Hangzhou, in Zhejiang Province, at the foot of Yuelun Hill facing the Qiantang River. Although the original was destroyed in 1121, the current tower was erected in 1156 and fully restored by 1165. Because of its size, the pagoda served as a permanent lighthouse to aid sailors at night (as described in Hangzhou Fu Zhi).

The Zhengjue Temple Pagoda in Pengxian County of Sichuan Province (near Chengdu) is a brick pagoda that was built between 1023 and 1026, according to inscriptions running along its first storey. It has a square base on a sumeru pedestal, thirteen stories totaling  in height, and multiple layers of eaves similar in style to the earlier Tang pagodas of Chang'an, the Giant Wild Goose Pagoda and the Small Wild Goose Pagoda.

Wood-and-brick hybrid pagodas were also built. The first four floors of the octagonal,  Lingxiao Pagoda of 1045 are brick (with wooden eaves), while from the fifth floor up it is entirely made of wood. Even pagodas made of stone or brick featured architectural elements that were typical of Chinese wooden buildings; for example the Pizhi Pagoda, built from 1056 to 1063, uses the dougong brackets typical of wooden architecture to hold up pent, shingled roofs and tiers. Both of these pagodas feature interior staircases, although the Lingxiao Pagoda's only reaches to the fourth floor, and the Pizhi Pagoda's to the fifth. However, the Pizhi Pagoda features winding exterior stairs that provide access to the ninth and topmost floor.

The Liaodi Pagoda in Dingzhou, Hebei Province is a stone and brick pagoda completed in 1055, and one of the tallest pre-modern Chinese constructions. At 84 meters (276 ft) tall, it is the tallest Chinese pagoda built in the dynastic era that is still standing, surpassing the  Qianxun Pagoda, which had held the record since its construction in the 9th century by the Kingdom of Dali. The Liaodi Pagoda has an octagonal base on a large platform. Buddhist landmark of the Kaiyuan Monastery, and a military purpose as a watch tower used to observe the enemy forces of the Liao dynasty. Beside their utility in surveillance, pagoda towers could also serve as astronomical observatories; one such is the Gaocheng Astronomical Observatory, built in 1276 and still standing today.

Temples

It was not uncommon for wealthy or powerful families to facilitate the construction of large temple complexes, usually by donating a portion of their family estate to a Buddhist sect. Often the land already contained buildings that could be re-purposed for religions use. The Fei (費) family of the town of Jinze, located just west of Shanghai, converted a mansion on their property into a Buddhist sutra-recitiation hall, and later built several other religious buildings around the hall. This spurred a boom in temple construction in the area, causing Jinze to become a major center of the White Lotus sect of Buddhism, which in turn spurred the construction of more temples and lead the town to become a significant location within the Song. The nearby town of Nanxiang gained prominence shortly after the fall of the Song in large part to the construction of temples and other religious buildings, which spanned the entire Song empire.

Apart from stimulating the development of urban areas, temples and religious buildings featured a number of unique aesthetic and structural features. The Temple of the Saintly Mother (圣母殿) and the Hall of Sacrifice of the Jin Temple (晋祠), located in a southeastern suburb of Taiyuan City, Shanxi province, are extant examples of early Song architecture. The Temple of the Saintly Mother is the main building of the Jin Temple, first built in the period between 1023 and 1032 and renovated in 1102. It has a double-eaved roof with nine ridges, and two dragon-heads with wide-open jaws biting the ends of the main ridge. The roof is supported by massive dougong brackets corresponding to drawings in Yingzao Fashi. The eaves of the Temple of the Saintly Mother curve upward slightly at each end, a characteristic of Song architecture. The columns of the façade, decorated with dragons that coil around the shafts, become progressively taller with increasing distance to either side of the central pair. The building has a porch around it, the sole example of such a structure; another unique feature of the site is a cross-shaped bridge that leads to the Goddess Temple.

The Trinity Hall of Xuan Miao Temple (玄妙观), situated in the heart of Suzhou city, is another example of Song architecture. In 1982, it was established as a National Heritage Site by the Chinese government.

The Jingling Palace (景灵宫 Jingling Gong), a temple to the legendary Yellow Emperor located near modern-day Qufu, was built in the 11th century. It was subsequently destroyed near the end of the Yuan dynasty. However, several other structures in Shou Qiu, the complex that Jingling Palace was situated in, remain intact. Two giant tortoise-borne steles flank what was the entrance to the palace. A large pyramid constructed of rounded stone blocks, the symbolic tomb of the Yellow Emperor's son Shaohao, is located outside the Shou Qiu complex. Another important large tortoise-borne stele of the same period has been preserved at the Dai Miao of Mount Tai.

Bridges

Bridges over waterways had been known in China since the ancient Zhou dynasty. During the Song dynasty, large trestle bridges were constructed, such as that built by Zhang Zhongyan in 1158. There were also large bridges made entirely of stone, like the Ba Zi Bridge of Shaoxing, built in 1256 and still standing today. Bridges with pavilions crowning their central spans were often featured in such paintings as the landscapes of Xia Gui (1195–1224). Long, covered corridor bridges, like the 12th-century Rainbow Bridge in Wuyuan, Jiangxi province, which has wide stone-based piers and a wooden superstructure, were also built.

While serving as an administrator for Hangzhou, the poet Su Shi (1037–1101) had a large pedestrian causeway built across the West Lake, which still bears his name: Sudi (蘇堤). In 1221, the Taoist traveler Qiu Changchun visited Genghis Khan in Samarkand, describing various Chinese bridges encountered on the way there through the Tian Shan Mountains, east of Yining. The historian Joseph Needham quotes Qiu as saying:
[The road had] "no less than 48 timber bridges of such width that two carts can drive over them side by side". It had been built by Chang Jung [Zhang Rong] and the other engineers of the Chagatai some years before. The wooden trestles of Chinese bridges from the −3rd century [BC] onwards were no doubt similar to those supposed to have been employed in Julius Caesar's bridge of −55 [BC] across the Rhine, or drawn by Leonardo, or found in use in Africa. But where in +13th century [AD] Europe could a two-lane highway like Chang Jung's have been found?

In Fujian Province, enormous beam bridges were built during the Song dynasty. No names of the engineers were recorded or appear in the inscriptions on the bridges, which give only the names of local officials who sponsored them and oversaw their construction and repair. However, there might have been an engineering school in Fujian, headed by a prominent engineer known as Cai Xiang (1012–1067), who had risen to the position of governmental prefect in Fujian. Between 1053 and 1059, he planned and supervised the construction of the large Wanan Bridge (once called the Luoyang Bridge) near Quanzhou (on the border of the present-day Luojiang District and Huai'an County. This bridge, a stone structure similar to a number of other bridges found in Fujian, still stands, and features ship-like piers bound to their bases using mucilage from oysters as an adhesive. Another famous bridge near Quanzhou, the Anping Bridge, was constructed between 1138 and 1151.

Other examples of Song bridges include Guyue Bridge, a stone arch bridge in Yiwu, Zhejiang Province. The bridge was built in 1213, the sixth year of the Jiading Era in the Southern Song dynasty. Song-era pontoon bridges include the Dongjin Bridge, 400 m ( mi) long, which may still be seen today.

Tombs of Northern Song emperors

Located southwest of Gongyi city in Henan province, the large tombs of the Northern Song number about one thousand, including individual tombs for Song emperors, empresses, princes, princesses, consorts, and members of the extended family. The construction of the complex began in 963 AD, during the reign of the first Song ruler, Emperor Taizu of Song, whose father is also buried at the site. The only Northern Song emperors not buried there are Emperor Huizong of Song and Emperor Qinzong of Song, who died in captivity after the Jin–Song Wars in 1127. Lining the spirit ways of the tomb complex are hundreds of Song sculptures and statues of tigers, rams, lions, horses with grooms, horned beasts and mythical creatures, government officials, military generals, foreign ambassadors, and others featured in an enormous display of Song-era artwork.

The layout and style of the Song tombs resemble those found in the contemporary Tangut kingdom of the Western Xia, which also had an auxiliary burial site associated with each tomb. At the center of each burial site is a truncated pyramidal tomb, each having once been guarded by a four-walled enclosure with four centered gates and four corner towers. About  from Gongxian is the Baisha Tomb, which contains "elaborate facsimiles in brick of Chinese timber frame construction, from door lintels to pillars and pedestals to bracket sets, that adorn interior walls." The Baisha Tomb has two large separate chambers with conical domed ceilings; a large staircase leads down to the entrance doors of the subterranean tomb.

Literature

During the Song dynasty, previous works on architecture were brought to more sophisticated levels of description, as in Yili Shigong written in 1193 AD. However, one of the most definitive works was the earlier Mu Jing ("Timberwork Manual"), ascribed to Yu Hao and written sometime between 965 and 995. Yu Hao was responsible for the construction of a wooden pagoda tower in Kaifeng, which was destroyed by lightning and replaced by the brick Iron Pagoda soon after. In his time, books on architecture were still considered a lowly scholarly achievement due to the craft's status, so Mu Jing was not even recorded in the official court bibliography. Although the book itself was lost to history, the scientist and statesman Shen Kuo wrote of Yu's work extensively in his Dream Pool Essays of 1088, praising it as a work of architectural genius, saying that no one in his own time could reproduce such a work. Shen Kuo singled out, among other passages, a scene in which Yu Hao gives advice to another artisan-architect about slanting struts in order to brace a pagoda against the wind, and a passage in which Yu Hao describes the three sections of a building, the area above the crossbeams, the area above ground, and the foundation, and then proceeds to provide proportional ratios and construction techniques for each section.

Several years later the Yingzao Fashi ("Treatise on Architectural Methods" or "State Building Standards") was published. Although similar books came before it, such as Yingshan Ling ("National Building Law") of the early Tang dynasty (618–907), this is a manual on Chinese architecture to have survived in full.

Yingzao Fashi

Yingzao Fashi is a technical treatise on architecture and craftsmanship written at the Directorate of Buildings and Construction. The book was completed in 1100 and presented to Emperor Zhezong of Song in the last year of his reign. His successor, Emperor Huizong of Song, had the treatise officially published three years later, in 1103, for the benefit of foremen, architects, and literate craftsmen. The book was intended to provide standard regulations, to not only the engineering agencies of the central government, but also the many workshops and artisan families throughout China who could benefit from using a well-written government manual on building practices.

Yingzao Fashi included building codes and regulations, accounting information, descriptions of construction materials, and classification of crafts. In its 34 chapters, the book outlined units of measurement, and the construction of moats, fortifications, stonework, and woodwork. For the latter, it included specifications for making bracketing units with inclined arms and joints for columns and beams. It also provided specifications for wood carving, drilling, sawing, bamboo work, tiling, wall building, and decoration. The book contained recipes for decorative paints, glazes, and coatings, also listing proportions for mixing mortars used in masonry, brickwork, and manufacture of glazed tiles, illustrating practices and standards with drawings. His book outlined structural carpentry in great detail, providing standard dimensional measurements for all components used.  here he developed a standard eight-grade system for sizing timber elements, known as the cai-fen system of units, which could be universally applied in buildings. About 8% of the book was derived from pre-existing written material on architecture, while the majority of the book documented the inherited traditions of craftsmen and architects. The Yingzao Fashi provided a full glossary of technical terms that included mathematical formulae, building proportions, and construction techniques, and discussed the implications of the local topography for construction at a particular site. He also estimated the monetary costs of hiring laborers of different skill levels from various crafts on the basis of a day's work, in addition to the price of the materials they would need and according to the season in which they were to be employed.

Architecture in Song artwork

See also

 Chinese architecture
 Caihua
 Chinese Palaces
 List of Chinese inventions

Notes

References
 
Guo, Qinghua. "Yingzao Fashi: Twelfth-Century Chinese Building Manual", Architectural History: Journal of the Society of Architectural Historians of Great Britain (Volume 41 1998): 1–13.

Steinhardt, Nancy Shatzman. "The Tangut Royal Tombs near Yinchuan", Muqarnas: An Annual on Islamic Art and Architecture (Volume X, 1993): 369–381.

External links
Information on Chinese pagodas

 
Song dynasty
Song dynasty
.